Topias Vilén (born 1 April 2003) is a Finnish professional ice hockey player for Lahti Pelicans of the Finnish Liiga on loan from the New Jersey Devils of the National Hockey League (NHL). He was selected 129th overall in the 2021 NHL Entry Draft by the Devils.

Playing career
Vilén made his Liiga debut in 2020 with Lahti Pelicans. On 13 May 2022, Vilén was signed to a three-year, entry-level contract with the New Jersey Devils, but was loaned back to the Pelicans for the 2022-23 season. He represented Finland at the 2023 World Junior Ice Hockey Championships.

Career statistics

Regular season and playoffs

International

References

External links
 

2003 births
Living people
Finnish ice hockey defencemen
Lahti Pelicans players
New Jersey Devils draft picks
Sportspeople from Lahti